Gregory Burns (born 5 March 1995) is a professional rugby league footballer who played as a  for Doncaster in the Betfred League One.

Burns is a graduate of the Eagles Academy system and has played in Sheffield's reserve team. He helped the Eagles to win the inaugural 1895 Cup as they defeated Widnes Vikings 36–18 in the final.

His brothers Jonathan and Paddy came through the Eagles' youth system. Paddy signed a professional contract with them in 2018 and Jonathan plays with the Hemel Stags.

On 14 April 2017, Greg scored his first professional try for the Eagles. It was against Rochdale Hornets in an 18–42 victory.

In November 2021, Burns signed for Doncaster on a one-year deal.

References

External links
Sheffield Eagles profile

1995 births
Living people
Doncaster R.L.F.C. players
English rugby league players
Sheffield Eagles players
Rugby league hookers
Rugby league players from Yorkshire